Aparna Jain is an author and an executive leadership coach. She is the author of four books - Own It: Leadership Lessons From Women Who Do, which was shortlisted for the Tata Lit Live Festival's Business Book of the Year category in 2016, Like A Girl (2018) and Boys will be Boys (2019) - biographies on inspiring men and women from India. She also authored the 'Sood Family Cookbook'.
Aparna advocates equal rights for women in the workplace and is a periodical contributor on the issue and many publications. Jain runs her own consulting company Zebraa Works.

Early life and education
Jain was born in New Delhi, but grew up in Bangalore in Karnataka. She has studied in different schools including Sophia High School in Bangalore, and Rishi Valley School, Madanapalle, Andhra Pradesh. Jain then moved to Switzerland where she studied at the Alpina School of Hotel Management and received a Diploma with a double specialisation in Sales & Marketing and Food & Beverage in 1993. She moved back to India to pursue a post graduate programme in Hospitality at the Oberoi School of Hotel Management in New Delhi. Jain is also certified as an Integral Master Coach by Integral Coaching in Canada.

Career
Jain has worked with a number of companies which include Sasken in Bangalore to the erstwhile Unimobile in Silicon Valley, and then in media with the India Today Group, where she was marketing head for magazines Cosmopolitan and Good Housekeeping. She also worked with Tehelka and was an executive director of their annual event, Think Fest, in 2011 and 2012. She has consulted with HarperCollins Ltd and was the consultant country head for the self-publishing division of Penguin Random House in India – Partridge. She writes guest columns on coaching and women in the workplace for newspapers and online media and also occasionally writes restaurant reviews for the newspaper Mint and Brown Paper Bag.

Books
Jain's first book is a cookbook on her family's traditional recipes called the Sood Family Cookbook, published by HarperColllins in 2013 
Variously called a compilation of a Pahaadi family's story, and a family food recipe memoir, the book has garnered rave reviews from food reviewers and bloggers alike.

Jain's second book, Own It: Leadership Lessons From Women Who Do, was published in 2016 by Harper Collins India. Based on interviews with over 200 women professionals in senior managerial and leadership positions in India, the book takes a thorough look at women's problems in the workplace. The book has been reviewed positively as ‘a resource for inspiration for women struggling with issues’ such as bias, bullying, sexual harassment, and impact of motherhood, and as a ‘go-to book for those chief executives and HR heads who are serious about fostering a gender-neutral workplace’.

Jain's third book, Like A Girl features stories of 51 women of varying fame—while some, like Kalpana Chawla, Lata Mangeshkar and Asha Bhosle, are household names, many others are practically unknown outside their home territories or professions, such as sports journalist Sharda Ugra and chef Ritu Dalmia.
The book was also nominated for the Crossword Book Awards - Popular Shortlist.

Her fourth book, Boys Will be Boys: Inspiring Stories for Smart Kidschronicles the lives of 45 Indian men who followed their heart and dared to be different - soldiers (Field Marshal Sam Manekshaw, 2nd Lt. Arun Khetrapal), a sailor who circumnavigated the globe (Commander Abhilash Tomy), a designer who took Indian fashion to Paris (Rahul Mishra), a doctor who revived rivers (Rajendra Singh), a barefoot artist (M.F. Husain), rocket scientists (A.P.J. Abdul Kalam, Homi Bhabha, Vikram Sarabhai), entrepreneurs (J.R.D. Tata, Azim Premji), engineers (E. Sreedharan), sportspersons (Bhaichung Bhutia, Vishwanathan Anand), journalists (P. Sainath, Josy Joseph) writers (Perumal Murugan, Vikram Seth, Anant Pai) and activists (Sunderlal Bahugana), among others.

Awards
2015-16
 Jury Appreciation Certificate for 'Own it' under the Non Fiction category
 South-Asia Laadli Media Awards for Gender Sensitivity 2015-16

References

1970 births
Living people
Indian marketing people
Indian women writers